Lai Sun is a Hong Kong conglomerate.

Lai Sun may refer to the following subsidiary entities of the group company:

Lai Sun Development
Lai Sun Garment
Lai Sun F.C.